Eusebio Díaz (1901–1959) was a Paraguayan football midfielder who played for Paraguay in the 1930 FIFA World Cup. He also played for Club Guaraní.

References

External links
FIFA profile

1901 births
Paraguayan footballers
Paraguay international footballers
Association football midfielders
Club Guaraní players
1930 FIFA World Cup players
1959 deaths